The 1981 Israel Super Cup was the 11th Israel Super Cup (16th, including unofficial matches, as the competition wasn't played within the Israel Football Association in its first 5 editions, until 1969), an annual Israel football match played between the winners of the previous season's Top Division and Israel State Cup. 

The match was played between Hapoel Tel Aviv, champions of the 1980–81 Liga Leumit and Bnei Yehuda, winners of the 1980–81 Israel State Cup.

This was Hapoel's 5th Israel Super Cup appearance and Bnei Yehuda's second (both including unofficial matches). At the match, played at Bloomfield Stadium, Hapoel Tel Aviv won 1–0.

Match details

References

1981
Super Cup
Super Cup 1981
Super Cup 1981
Israel Super Cup matches